Sedrick Irvin (born March 30, 1978) is an American football coach and former player. He is the running backs coach at Gulliver Preparatory School. Irvin was formally the head football coach at Miami Senior High School and Westminster Christian School in Palmetto Bay, Florida. Irvin played college football at Michigan State University and professionally in the National Football League (NFL) with the Detroit Lions.

Early years
Irvin played high school football at Miami Southridge Senior High School and Miami Senior High School, where he was named a USA Today All-American in 1995. He played college football at Michigan State where he was well known for his jukes and stutter steps en route to 1,000 yard rushing seasons in each of his three seasons there. His sophomore season, in 1997, he ran for 1,211 yards on 231 carries and scored 9 touchdowns. As a junior in 1998, he ran for 1,167 yards on 272 carries and scored 10 touchdowns.

Irvin left Michigan State after his junior season with the fourth most rushing yards in school history to enter the National Football League Draft.

Professional playing career
Irvin fell to the fourth round in the 1999 NFL Draft due to  scouts citing that he was too slow for the NFL game. He led the Detroit Lions in touchdowns his rookie year while backing up James Stewart. After two years in which he was beset by injuries, the Lions let Irvin go. He signed with the Miami Dolphins in hopes of returning to the NFL, but never saw game time. He also played in NFL Europe and the Arena Football League where he played linebacker and fullback, both positions new to him.

Coaching career
Irvin was formerly an assistant coach at Gulliver Preparatory School in Miami. From 2008 to 2009, he worked under head coach Nick Saban at the University of Alabama. During his acceptance speech for the Heisman Trophy, Alabama running back Mark Ingram II thanked Irvin for helping him throughout his college career. On January 14, 2010, Irvin was named the running backs coach for the Memphis Tigers

On March 6, 2011, he was hired as the new head football coach for Westminster Christian School. In April 2016, Sedrick Irvin was hired to the East Carolina University coaching staff.

Personal life
Sedrick Irvin is married with two sons. Irvin is the cousin of former Dallas Cowboys wide receiver and Pro Football Hall of Famer Michael Irvin.

References

1978 births
Living people
American football running backs
Alabama Crimson Tide football coaches
Berlin Thunder players
Columbus Destroyers players
Detroit Lions players
Memphis Tigers football coaches
Michigan State Spartans football players
High school football coaches in Florida
Miami Southridge Senior High School alumni
Players of American football from Miami
Sports coaches from Miami
Coaches of American football from Florida
African-American coaches of American football
African-American players of American football
20th-century African-American sportspeople
21st-century African-American sportspeople